Douglas Haynes (born 18 January 1953) is a Vincentian cricketer. He played in one List A and four first-class matches for the Windward Islands in 1971/72.

See also
 List of Windward Islands first-class cricketers

References

External links
 

1953 births
Living people
Saint Vincent and the Grenadines cricketers
Windward Islands cricketers